Glückauf-Kampfbahn is a multi-use stadium in Gelsenkirchen, North Rhine-Westphalia, Germany. It was initially used as the stadium of FC Schalke 04 matches. It was replaced by Parkstadion in 1973. The capacity of the stadium is 11,000 spectators.

External links
 Stadium history

Football venues in Germany
FC Schalke 04
Sports venues in North Rhine-Westphalia
Buildings and structures in Gelsenkirchen